The Boven Merwede is a stretch of river in the Netherlands, mainly fed by the river Rhine. The Afgedamde Maas river joins the Waal at Woudrichem to form the Boven Merwede, which at Hardinxveld-Giessendam splits into the Beneden Merwede river on the right and the Nieuwe Merwede river on the left. The Merwede is part of the main shipping route between Rotterdam and Germany.

A road bridge connects the west side of Gorinchem on the north to the west side of Sleeuwijk on the south.

There are three passenger ferries.

Rivers of the Rhine–Meuse–Scheldt delta
Distributaries of Europe
Rivers of North Brabant
Rivers of South Holland
Rivers of the Netherlands
Alblasserwaard
Land van Heusden en Altena
Geography of Altena, North Brabant
Gorinchem
Hardinxveld-Giessendam